Yersinia pseudotuberculosis is a Gram-negative bacterium that causes Far East scarlet-like fever in humans, who occasionally get infected zoonotically, most often through the food-borne route. Animals are also infected by Y. pseudotuberculosis. The bacterium is urease positive.

Pathogenesis
In animals, Y. pseudotuberculosis can cause tuberculosis-like symptoms, including localized tissue necrosis and granulomas in the spleen, liver, and lymph nodes.

In humans, symptoms of Far East scarlet-like fever are similar to those of infection with Yersinia enterocolitica (fever and right-sided abdominal pain), except that the diarrheal component is often absent, which sometimes makes the resulting condition difficult to diagnose. Y. pseudotuberculosis infections can mimic appendicitis, especially in children and younger adults, and, in rare cases, the disease may cause skin complaints (erythema nodosum), joint stiffness and pain (reactive arthritis), or spread of bacteria to the blood (bacteremia).

Far East scarlet-like fever usually becomes apparent five to 10 days after exposure and typically lasts one to three weeks without treatment. In complex cases or those involving immunocompromised patients, antibiotics may be necessary for resolution; ampicillin, aminoglycosides, tetracycline, chloramphenicol, or a cephalosporin may all be effective.

The recently described syndrome "Izumi-fever" has been linked to infection with Y. pseudotuberculosis.

The symptoms of fever and abdominal pain mimicking appendicitis (actually from mesenteric lymphadenitis)  associated with Y. pseudotuberculosis infection are not typical of the diarrhea and vomiting from classical food poisoning incidents.  Although Y. pseudotuberculosis is usually only able to colonize hosts by peripheral routes and cause serious disease in immunocompromised individuals, if this bacterium gains access to the blood stream, it has an LD50 comparable to Y. pestis at only 10 CFU.

Relationship to Y. pestis
Genetically, the pathogen causing plague, Y. pestis, is very similar to Y. pseudotuberculosis. The plague appears to have diverged from Y. pseudotuberculosis relatively recently - about 1,500 to 20,000 years ago, and shortly before the first historically recorded outbreaks in humans. A 2015 paper in Cell argued for a divergence around 6,000 years ago. These modern estimates differ dramatically from earlier suggestions in popular scientific literature which claimed that Y. pestis evolved in rodents "millions of years ago."

Virulence factors
To facilitate attachment, invasion, and colonization of its host, this bacterium possesses many virulence factors.  Superantigens, bacterial adhesions, and the actions of Yops (which are bacterial proteins once thought to be "Yersinia outer membrane proteins") that are encoded on the "[plasmid] for Yersinia virulence" – commonly known as the pYV – cause host pathogenesis and allow the bacteria to live parasitically.

pYV
The 70-kb pYV is critical to Yersinia'''s pathogenicity, since it contains many genes known to encode virulence factors and its loss gives avirulence of all Yersinia  species.  A 26-kb "core region" in the pYV contains the ysc genes, which regulate the expression and secretion of Yops.  Many Ysc proteins also amalgamate to form a type-III secretory apparatus, which secretes many Yops into the host cell cytoplasm with the assistance of the "translocation apparatus", constructed of YopB and YopD.  The core region also includes yopN, yopB, yopD, tyeA, lcrG, and lcrV, which also regulate Yops gene expression and help to translocate secretory Yops to the target cell.  For example, YopN and TyeA are positioned as a plug on the apparatus so only their conformational change, induced by their interaction with certain host cell membrane proteins, will cause the unblocking of the secretory pathway.  Secretion is regulated in this fashion so that proteins are not expelled into the extracellular matrix and elicit an immune response.  Since this pathway gives secretion selectivity, it is a virulence factor.

Effector Yops
In contrast to the ysc and yop genes listed above, the Yops that act directly on host cells to cause cytopathologic effects – "effector Yops" – are encoded by pYV genes external to this core region. The sole exception is LcrV, which is also known as the "versatile Yop" for its two roles as an effector Yop and as a regulatory Yop.  The combined function of these effector Yops permits the bacteria to resist internalization by immune and intestinal cells and to evade the bactericidal actions of neutrophils and macrophages.  Inside the bacterium, these Yops are bound by pYV-encoded Sycs (specific Yop chaperones), which prevent premature interaction with other proteins and guide the Yops to a type-III secretory apparatus.  In addition to the Syc-Yop complex, Yops are also tagged for type III secretion either by the first 60nt in their corresponding mRNA transcript or by their corresponding first 20 N-terminal amino acids.
LcrV, YopQ, YopE, YopT, YopH, YpkA, YopJ, YopM, and YadA are all secreted by the type-III secretory pathway.  LcrV inhibits neutrophil chemotaxis and cytokine production, allowing Y. pseudotuberculosis to form large colonies without inducing systemic failure and, with YopQ, contributes to the translocation process by bringing YopB and YopD to the eukaryotic cell membrane for pore-formation.  By causing actin filament depolymerisation, YopE, YopT, and YpkA resist endocytosis by intestinal cells and phagocytosis while giving cytotoxic changes in the host cell.  YopT targets Rho GTPase, commonly named "RhoA", and uncouples it from the membrane, leaving it in an inactive RhoA-GDI (guanine nucleotide dissociation inhibitor)-bound state whereas YopE and YpkA convert Rho proteins to their inactive GDP-bound states by expressing GTPase activity.  YpkA also catalyses serine autophosphorylation, so it may have regulatory functions in Yersinia or undermine host cell immune response signal cascades since YpkA is targeted to the cytoplasmic side of the host cell membrane.  YopH acts on host focal adhesion sites by dephosphorylating several phosphotyrosine residues on focal adhesion kinase (FAK) and the focal adhesion proteins paxillin and p130.  Since FAK phosphorylation is involved in uptake of yersiniae as well as T cell and B cell responses to antigen-binding, YopH elicits antiphagocytic and other anti-immune effects.  YopJ, which shares an operon with YpkA, "...interferes with the mitogen-activated protein (MAP) kinase activities of c-Jun N-terminal kinase (JNK), p38, and extracellular signal-regulated kinase", leading to macrophage apoptosis.  In addition, YopJ inhibits TNF-α release from many cell types, possibly through an inhibitory action on NF-κB, suppressing inflammation and the immune response.  By secretion through a type III pathway and localization in the nucleus by a vesicle-associated, microtubule-dependent method, YopM may alter host cell growth by binding to RSK (ribosomal S6 kinase), which regulates cell cycle regulation genes.  YadA has lost its adhesion, opsonisation-resisting, phagocytosis-resisting, and respiratory burst-resisting functions in Y. pseudotuberculosis due to a frameshift mutation by a single base-pair deletion in yadA in comparison to yadA in Y. enterocolitica, yet it still is secreted by type III secretion.  The yop genes, yadA, ylpA, and the virC operon are considered the "Yop regulon" since they are coregulated by pYV-encoded VirF.  virF is in turn thermoregulated.  At 37 degrees Celsius, chromosomally encoded Ymo, which regulates DNA supercoiling around the virF gene, changes conformation, allowing for virF expression, which then up-regulates the Yop regulon.

AdhesionY. pseudotuberculosis adheres strongly to intestinal cells via chromosomally encoded proteins so that Yop secretion may occur, to avoid being removed by peristalsis, and to invade target host cells.  A transmembrane protein, invasin, facilitates these functions by binding to host cell αβ1 integrins.  Through this binding, the integrins cluster, thereby activating FAK, and causing a corresponding reorganization of the cytoskeleton.  Subsequent internalization of bound bacteria occurs when the actin-depolymerising Yops are not being expressed.  The protein encoded on the "attachment invasion locus" named Ail also bestows attachment and invasive abilities upon Yersiniae while interfering with the binding of complement on the bacterial surface.  To increase binding specificity, the fibrillar pH6 antigen targets bacteria to target intestinal cells only when thermoinduced.

Superantigens
Certain strains of Yersinia pseudotuberculosis express a superantigenic exotoxin, YPM, or the Y. pseudotuberculosis-derived mitogen, from the chromosomal ypm gene.  YPM specifically binds and causes the proliferation of T lymphocytes expressing the Vβ3, Vβ7, Vβ8, Vβ9, Vβ13.1, and Vβ13.2 variable regions  with CD4+ T cell preference, although activation of some CD8+ T cells occurs.  This T cell expansion can cause splenomegaly coupled with IL-2 and IL-4 overproduction.  Since administering anti-TNF-α and anti-IFN-γ monoclonal antibodies neutralizes YPM toxicity in vivo, these cytokines are largely responsible for the damage caused indirectly by the exotoxin.  Strains that carry the exotoxin gene are rare in Western countries, where the disease, when at all apparent, manifests itself largely with minor symptoms, whereas more than 95% of strains from Far Eastern countries contain ypm and are correlated with Izumi fever and Kawasaki disease.
Although the superantigen poses the greatest threat to host health, all virulence factors contribute to Y. pseudotuberculosis viability in vivo and define the bacterium’s pathogenic characteristics.  Y. pseudotuberculosis can live extracellularly due to its formidable mechanisms of phagocytosis and opsonisation resistance through the expression of Yops and the type III pathway; yet, by limited pYV action, it can populate host cells, especially macrophages, intracellularly to further evade immune responses and be disseminated throughout the body.

FunctionYersinia pseudotuberculosis-derived mitogens (YpM) are superantigens, which are able to excessively activate T cells by binding to the T cell receptor. Since YpM can activate large numbers of the T cell population, this leads the release of inflammatory cytokines.

Structure
Members of this family of Yersinia pseudotuberculosis mitogens adopt a sandwich structure consisting of 9 strands in two beta sheets, in a jelly roll fold topology. YpM molecular weight is about 14 kDa. Structurally, it is unlike any other superantigen, but is remarkably similar to the tumour necrosis factor and viral capsid proteins. This suggests a possible evolutionary relationship.

Subfamilies
Some highly similar homologous variants of YPM have been characterized, including YPMa, YPMb, and YPMc.

 small non-coding RNA 
Numerous bacterial small non-coding RNAs have been identified to play regulatory functions. Some can regulate the virulence genes. 150 unannotated sRNAs were identified by sequencing of Y. pseudotuberculosis'' RNA libraries from bacteria grown at 26 °C and 37 °C, suggesting they may play a role in pathogenesis. By using single-molecule fluorescence in situ hybridisation  smFISH technique it was shown that the number of YSR35 RNA increased 2.5 times upon temperature shift from 25 °C to 37 °C. Another study uncovered that a temperature-induced global reprogramming of central metabolic functions are likely to support intestinal colonization of the pathogen. Environmentally controlled regulatory RNAs coordinate control of metabolism and virulence allowing rapid adaptation and high flexibility during life-style changes. High-throughput RNA structure probing identified many thermoresponsive RNA structures.

See also 
 Intergenic RNA thermometer

References

External links 

Yersinia pseudotuberculosis genome

Type strain of Yersinia pseudotuberculosis at BacDive -  the Bacterial Diversity Metadatabase

pseudotuberculosis
Bacteria described in 1889